Don't Let Go is the fourteenth studio album by American soul musician Isaac Hayes. The album was released in 1979, by Polydor Records. The album debuted at number 39 on the Billboard 200.

Track listing
All tracks composed by Isaac Hayes; except where indicated

Charts

Weekly charts

Year-end charts

References

1979 albums
Isaac Hayes albums
albums produced by Isaac Hayes
Polydor Records albums